Jorunna rubescens is a species of sea slug, a dorid nudibranch, a shell-less marine gastropod mollusc in the family Discodorididae.

Distribution
This species was described from the Philippines.

References

External links
 

Discodorididae
Gastropods described in 1876